Atrauli Assembly constituency is one of the 403 constituencies of the Uttar Pradesh Legislative Assembly, India. It is a part of the Aligarh district and one of the five assembly constituencies in the Aligarh Lok Sabha constituency. First election in this assembly constituency was held in 1952 after the "DPACO (1951)" (delimitation order) was passed in 1951. After the "Delimitation of Parliamentary and Assembly Constituencies Order" was passed in 2008, the constituency was assigned identification number 73.

Wards / Areas
Extent of Atrauli Assembly constituency is KCs Atrauli, Dadon, Bijoli, PCs Gaonkhera, Ganiyawali, Jujharka, Gobli, Chendauli Buzurg, Bhavigarh, Koreh Raghupura, Fazalpur, Rehmapur, Gajipur, Tebthu, Madapur, Utara, Puraini Ismailpur of Barala KC & Atrauli MB of Atrauli Tehsil.

Members of Vidhan Sabha

Election results

2022

2017

2012

See also
Aligarh district
Aligarh Lok Sabha constituency
Sixteenth Legislative Assembly of Uttar Pradesh
Uttar Pradesh Legislative Assembly

References

External links
 

Politics of Aligarh district
Assembly constituencies of Uttar Pradesh
Constituencies established in 1951